Langford is a suburb of Perth, Western Australia, located within the City of Gosnells. Its postcode is 6147.

Langford was named after a Mr Langford, a long-serving local councillor of the Shire of Gosnells. The shire submitted the name in September 1966, having chosen it alongside the State Housing Commission; the name was approved in January 1967. Recently the suburb has been upgraded and redeveloped, especially since it now links to a major highway. The suburb has had its share of social problems having originally had a large proportion of state run housing, much of which has now been renovated and sold to private owners. Langford offers facilities such as several primary schools, several churches, a sporting complex and shopping centre including a delicatessen, pub and chemist.

References

External links

Suburbs of Perth, Western Australia
Suburbs in the City of Gosnells